BioValley is the leading life science cluster in Europe, founded 1996. It connects academia and companies of three nations in the Upper Rhine Valley, namely France, Germany and Switzerland. The main objective is the greater research cooperation between companies and academia involved in the life science sectors, including pharmacology, biotechnology, nanotechnology, medical technology, chemistry and agricultural biotechnology.

See also 

BioValley
Silicon Alley
Silicon Hills
Silicon Valley
Tech Valley

External links
 Webpage Trinational Biovalley
 Webpage Biovalley Basel
 Webpage Alsace Biovalley
 Webpage Biovalley Germany

Press releases
 www.naturejobs.com

High-technology business districts
High-technology business districts in France
Rhine
1996 establishments in France
1996 establishments in Germany
1996 establishments in Switzerland
1996 in Europe
Organizations established in 1996